Oakwood is an unincorporated community in LaPorte County, Indiana, in the United States.

History
A post office was established at Oakwood in 1875, and remained in operation until it was discontinued in 1914. Oakwood contained a station on the railroad.

References

Unincorporated communities in LaPorte County, Indiana
Unincorporated communities in Indiana